Pino Daeni (November 8, 1939May 25, 2010) was an Italian-American book illustrator and artist. He is known for his style of feminine, romantic women and strong men painted with loose but accurate brushwork. Considered one of the highest paid book illustrators of his time, he created over 3,000 book covers, movie posters and magazine illustrations.

Biography
Born Giuseppe Dangelico Daeni in Bari, Italy, in November 8, 1939, his talents were recognized by his first grade teacher, who advised Pino's father, Tommaso Dangelico, to encourage his son's artistic precociousness. However, Tommaso remained skeptical of his son's future as an artist.

He was a self-taught artist. Eventually, Pino enrolled at the Art Institute of Bari, then went on to Milan’s Academy of Brera in 1960, where he honed his craft for painting from the live nude.

From 1960 to 1979, his work garnered several prizes and awards. During this period, he was commissioned by two of Italy's largest publishers, Mondadori and Rizzoli, for numerous book illustrations. After a visit to Manhattan in 1971, Pino's experiences of the art scene at that period led him to feel restricted in Milan, and in 1978, he moved to New York, where he believed the artistic freedom would allow him greater opportunities. He brought with him his  family—wife Chiara, seven-year-old daughter Paola, and five-year-old son Max.

Under the sponsorship of the Borghi Gallery, he held several shows in New York and Massachusetts. His work caught the attention of both Dell and Zebra Book Publishers, and soon after, Bantam, Simon & Schuster, Penguin USA, Dell, and Harlequin. His romance novel covers, painted for such authors as Danielle Steel, Sylvie Summerfield and Amanda Ashley, helped sell millions of books using a then unknown fellow Milanese Italian model named Fabio. By the end of his career, he had designed about 3,000 book covers.

In 1992, Pino felt the strain of tight deadlines. Eager to leave illustration behind to return to his impressionist revival painting, he contacted one of the major galleries in Scottsdale, Arizona and sent five paintings, which were well received. From then on, his paintings appeared in Hilton Head Island, South Carolina and in Garden City, Long Island, NY. Pino made several appearances on major TV networks, and was interviewed in national and international journals.

In 2001, Pino's son, Max, began representing his artist-father, despite Pino's initial reluctance. Max successfully grew his efforts into a profitable marketing company, helping his father expand beyond his normal gallery representation to include magazines, books and limited edition fine art prints.

His work continues to appear in art galleries all over the world, and his giclée prints sell into the thousands of dollars.

On May 25, 2010, Pino died at the age of 70 due to cancer.

Influences
Pino was deeply influenced by the Pre-Raphaelites and Macchiaioli, and after experimenting with Expressionism, he returned to his Impressionist roots. He found inspiration in the works of such artists as Sargent, Sorolla, and Boldini.

Style
His subject matter often revolves around sensuous women in beaches and boudoir settings indoors in tetradic color schemes that evoke the 19th century with women that are beautiful yet confident. Pino painted with oils on linen.

His trademark brushwork is characterized by softly lit females painted with smooth greenish shadows and distinctive, thick pastel-tinted highlights, often with vibrant colored dresses and backgrounds. Noted for his ability to capture fleeting expressions and movement, his women are often lost in thought or waiting for their lovers.

Artworks
A Mother's Love
A Pause
Affection
After Dinner
Afternoon Nap
Afternoon Stroll
An Enchanted Moment
Angel From Above
Angelica
Anticipation
A time to remember
At the Beach
Best Friends
Botanical Eden
Close To My Heart
My Favourite Time
Colorful Archway
Contemplation
Day Dream
Deborah Revisited
Desire Suite
Dreamer
Early Morning
Ester
Ethereal Beauty
Evening Repose
Evening Thoughts
First Glance
Fleeting Moments
Flower Child
Harmony Suite
Her Favorite Book
In the Glow
In the Late Evening
Innocence
Into The Night
Joyous Memories
La Diva
Last Touch
Late Night Reading
Long Day
Longing For
Love Suite
Maternal Instincts
Memories of My Past
Mixed Emotions
Morning Breeze
Morning Reflections
Mystic Dreams
Parisian Girl
Passive Moments
Precious Moments
Purity
Recital
Reflections
Remember When
Restful
Sensuality
Serendipity
Shades of Pale
Sharing Moments
Silent Contemplation
Soft Light
Solace
Spring Flower
Summer Retreat
Summertime Breeze
Sunday Chores
The Star
The Dancer
The Gypsy
The Red Shawl
The Safety of Love
Thinking of You
Whispering Heart
White Camisole
White Rhapsody
White Sand
Windy Field
Wistful Thinking
A Woman of Mystery
A Time To Remember
Good Old Days
Mediterranean Breeze
Mediterranean Dreams
Remember When
Spirit of Love
The Gathering
Woman from Dubai

References

External links
Giuseppe Dangelico Pino on artnet
PinoArt.com

1939 births
American illustrators
20th-century Italian painters
Italian male painters
21st-century Italian painters
2010 deaths
Romance cover artists
20th-century Italian male artists
21st-century Italian male artists